This is a list of seasons player by the women's team of Tyresö FF, a Swedish football club.

Summary

References

seasons
Tyresö
Tyresö